Level-set methods (LSM) are a conceptual framework for using level sets as a tool for numerical analysis of surfaces and shapes. The advantage of the level-set model is that one can perform numerical computations involving curves and surfaces on a fixed Cartesian grid without having to parameterize these objects (this is called the Eulerian approach). Also, the level-set method makes it very easy to follow shapes  that change topology, for example, when a shape splits in two, develops holes, or the reverse of these operations.  All these make the level-set method a great tool for modeling time-varying objects, like inflation of an airbag, or a drop of oil floating in water.

The figure on the right illustrates several important ideas about the level-set method. In the upper-left corner we see a shape; that is, a bounded region with a well-behaved boundary. Below it, the red surface is the graph of a level set function  determining this shape, and the flat blue region represents the xy plane.

In the top row we see the shape changing its topology by splitting in two. It would be quite hard to describe this transformation numerically by parameterizing the boundary of the shape and following its evolution. One would need an algorithm able to detect the moment the shape splits in two, and then construct parameterizations for the two newly obtained curves.  On the other hand, if we look at the bottom row, we see that the level set function merely translated downward. This is an example of when it can be much easier to work with a shape through its level-set function than with the shape directly, where using the shape directly would need to consider and handle all the possible deformations the shape might undergo.

and the level-set method manipulates  implicitly, through the function .  This function  is assumed to take positive values inside the region delimited by the curve  and negative values outside.

The level-set equation

If the curve  moves in the normal direction with a speed , then the level-set function  satisfies the level-set equation 

This is a partial differential equation, in particular a Hamilton–Jacobi equation, and can be solved numerically, for example, by using finite differences on a Cartesian grid.

The numerical solution of the level-set equation, however, requires sophisticated techniques. Simple finite-difference methods fail quickly. Upwinding methods, such as the Godunov method, fare better; however, the level-set method does not guarantee the conservation of the volume and the shape of the level set in an advection field that does conserve the shape and size, for example, uniform or rotational velocity field. Instead, the shape of the level set may get severely distorted, and the level set may vanish over several time steps. For this reason, high-order finite-difference schemes are generally required, such as high-order essentially non-oscillatory (ENO) schemes, and even then the feasibility of long-time simulations is questionable. Further sophisticated methods to deal with this difficulty have been developed, e.g., combinations of the level-set method with tracing marker particles advected by the velocity field.

Example 

The circle will shrink and eventually collapse down to a point. If an initial distance field is constructed (i.e. a function whose value is the signed euclidean distance to the boundary, positive interior, negative exterior) on the initial circle, the normalised gradient of this field will be the circle normal.

If the field has a constant value subtracted from it in time, the zero level (which was the initial boundary) of the new fields will also be circular and will similarly collapse to a point.  This is due to this being effectively the temporal integration of the Eikonal equation with a fixed front velocity.

In combustion, this method is used to describe the instantaneous flame surface, known as the G equation.

History

The level-set method was developed in 1979 by Alain Dervieux, and subsequently popularized by Stanley Osher and James Sethian. It has become popular in many disciplines, such as image processing, computer graphics, computational geometry, optimization, computational fluid dynamics, and computational biology.

A number of level-set data structures have been developed to facilitate the use of the level-set method in computer applications.

Applications 

 Computational fluid dynamics
 Combustion
 Trajectory planning
 Optimization
 Image processing
 Computational biophysics
 Discrete complex dynamics: visulalisation of parameter plane and dynamic plane

Computational fluid dynamics 

To run a Math Model in the interface of two different fluids we need to soften the interactions between the fluids. Therefore we need to apply a specific function: Compact Level Set Method.

As a “spin off”, the CompactLSM is a complement of the LSM, that helps solving LSM equations. It can be used in numerical simulation of flow, for example, if we are working with discretization of the interface water-air, compacts at sixth order, ensures the accurate and fast calculation of the interface equations (Monteiro 2018).

The LSM uses a distance function to locate different fluids. A distance function is that whose value represents the smallest distance from the point where it is being analyzed to the interface. This distance function is identified by isolines (2D) or isosurfaces (3D), showing that  the negative values refer to one of the fluids, positive values refer to the other and the zero value corresponds to the position of the interface.

But, how is the Heaviside function inserted in the Compact Level Set Method?

Since the specific mass and viscosity are discontinuous at the interface, both excess diffusion problem (interface widening) and numerical oscillations are expected if there is no adequate treatment of the fluid near the interface. To minimize these problems, the Level Set method uses a smooth, cell-related Heaviside function that explicitly defines the interface position (∅ = 0).

The transition in the interface is kept smooth, but with a thickness of the order of magnitude of the cell size, to avoid the introduction of disturbances with a length scale equal to that of the mesh, since the interface infers an abrupt jump property from one cell to the next (Unverdi and Tryggvason, 1992). To reconstruct the material properties of the flow, such as specific mass and viscosity, another marker function, I (∅), of the Heaviside type is used:

where δ is an empirical coefficient, usually equal to 1; 5 and Δ is the characteristic discretization of the problem, which varies according to the phenomenon to be simulated. The value of δ represents an interface with a thickness of three cells, and thus δΔ represents half the thickness of the interface. Note that in this method, the interface has a virtual thickness, as it is represented by a smooth function. Physical properties, such as specific mass and kinematic viscosity, are calculated as:

where ρ1, ρ2, v1 and v2 are the specific mass and kinematic viscosity of fluids 1 and 2. Equation  can be applied analogously to the other properties of the fluids.

See also

 Contour boxplot
 Zebra striping (computer graphics)
 G equation
 Advanced Simulation Library
 Volume of fluid method
 Image segmentation#Level-set methods
 Immersed boundary method
 Stochastic Eulerian Lagrangian method
 Level set (data structures)
 Posterization

References

External links
 See Ronald Fedkiw's academic web page for many stunning pictures and animations showing how the level-set method can be used to model real-life phenomena, like fire, water, cloth, fracturing materials, etc.
 Multivac is a C++ library for front tracking in 2D with level-set methods.
 James Sethian's web page on level-set method.
 Stanley Osher's homepage.

Optimization algorithms and methods
Computer graphics algorithms
Image processing
Computational fluid dynamics
Articles containing video clips